C. costaricense can refer to a few different species of plants.  The specific epithet  refers to the country of Costa Rica where many of these species may be found.

 Caryocar costaricense, a vulnerable species of plant in the family Caryocaraceae
 Cirsium costaricense, a synonym for Cirsium mexicanum and known as Mexican thistle
 Citharexylum costaricense, a species of fiddlewood in the genus Citharexylum
 Cymbopetalum costaricense, a tree in the family Annonaceae sometimes used as a spice